A sun cross, solar cross, or wheel cross is a solar symbol consisting of an equilateral cross inside a circle.

The design is frequently found in the symbolism of prehistoric cultures,  particularly during the Neolithic to Bronze Age periods of European prehistory. The symbol's ubiquity and apparent importance in prehistoric religion have given rise to its interpretation as a solar symbol, whence the modern English term "sun cross" (a calque of ). The symbol  means village in Ancient Egyptian (Gardiner symbol O49).  

The same symbol is in use as a modern astronomical symbol representing the Earth rather than the Sun. In pharmacy, sun cross symbol represents various/miscellaneous drugs.

After World War II, variants of the symbol became associated with neo-Nazi and white supremacist movements.

Interpretation as solar symbol

The interpretation of the simple equilateral cross as a solar symbol in Bronze Age religion was widespread in 19th-century scholarship. The cross-in-a-circle was interpreted as a solar symbol derived from the interpretation of the disc of the Sun as the wheel of the chariot of the Sun god.
Wieseler (1881) postulated an (unattested) Gothic rune  ("wheel") representing the solar deity by the "wheel" symbol of a cross-in-a-circle, reflected by the Gothic letter hwair (𐍈).

The English term "Sun-Cross", on the other hand, is comparatively recent, apparently loaned from German  and used in the 1955 translation of Rudolf Koch's Book of Signs ("The Sun-Cross or Cross of Wotan", p. 94).

The German term  was used in 19th-century scholarly literature of any cross symbol interpreted as a solar symbol, an equilateral cross either with or without a circle, or an oblique cross (Saint Andrew's cross).  was used of the flag design of the Paneuropean Union in the 1920s. In the 1930s, a version of the symbol with broken arms (resembling a curved swastika, illustrated below) was popular as a link between Christianity and Germanic paganism in the  German Faith Movement.

Archaeological record

Bronze Age
In the prehistoric religion of Bronze Age Europe, crosses in circles appear frequently on artifacts identified as cult items, for example the  "miniature standard" with an amber inlay that shows a cross shape when held against the light, dating to the Nordic Bronze Age, held at the National Museum of Denmark, Copenhagen. The Bronze Age symbol has also been connected with the spoked chariot wheel, which at the time was four-spoked (compare the Linear B ideogram 243 "wheel" ).  In the context of a culture that celebrated the sun chariot, it may thus have had a "solar" connotation (compare the Trundholm sun chariot).

Modern culture

Astronomy
The same symbol represents the Earth in astronomical symbols, while the Sun is represented by a circle with a center point.

Commerce
The Atchison, Topeka, and Santa Fe Railroad emblem was a cross in a circle with the words "Santa Fe" across the horizontal bar. In this case, the lines making up the cross were much wider than the circle.

Ethnography
The Sacred Hoop aka Medicine Wheel is a similar symbol in widespread use by Native Americans including Plains Indians and previously by Hopewell cultures. Other indigenous peoples also use or used the solar cross on their symbolism and as decoration practices.

Politics
The Sassanian Empire in Persia used a similar solar cross on their banner, called the Derafsh Kaviani symbol.

The Norwegian fascist party  used a golden sun cross on a red background as an official symbol from 1933 to 1945. The cross with the circle was attached to Olaf II of Norway, patron saint of Norway, and the colors were the coat of arms of Norway.

The Paneuropean Union, a European unification movement, uses this symbol as central element of its flag. 

A square cross interlocking with or surrounded by a circle is one of the most popular symbols used by individuals and organisations to represent white nationalism, white supremacy, Neo-Nazism, and white pride. In its Celtic cross form, it is used as the logo for white nationalist website Stormfront. This stems from the use of a circled cross by Norwegian Nazis during World War II.

In Germany, a "stylized" circled cross was adopted by a prohibited political party (VSBD/PdA), leading to a ban of the symbol if used within a context of promoting racism (see Strafgesetzbuch section 86a). Although there were doubts on the constitutionality of the ban, it was upheld in a decision of the supreme court.

In Italy, there is a similar ban based on Legge Mancino (the "Mancino Law", from the Minister of Interior who enacted the law), although there are some examples of the use of the circled cross as a Roman Catholic symbol in Northern Italy.

Tools
A similar glyph is used in tool sets to denote Phillips-head screws and screwdrivers.

Unicode
There is no formal code point in Unicode for this symbol, though other symbols representing the sun are included.

Examples

See also

References

Bronze Age Europe
Crosses in heraldry
Solar symbols
Magic symbols
Early Germanic symbols